Todd W. Langen is an American screenwriter and former engineer, best known for his work on Teenage Mutant Ninja Turtles.

Early life
Langen was born in Detroit and earned a master's degree in aerospace engineering from the University of Michigan.

He was 30 years old and working on the Space Shuttle for Hughes Aircraft Company when he decided that what he really wanted to do with his life was to be a screenwriter. His first sale was an episode of Pursuit of Happiness, a television comedy series that lasted less than two months.

Career
He soon became a regular writer of The Wonder Years. His biggest success would come when Langen was hired to work on the film adaptation of Teenage Mutant Ninja Turtles: The original treatment of 1990's Teenage Mutant Ninja Turtles was written by Bobby Herbeck; Langen was called in to do a "Page One rewrite," that is, a complete revision based on a screenplay that a studio had deemed interesting bur unworkable as submitted.  Langen and Herbeck did not work together and did not meet until the film opened.  He is listed first in the credits. Langen would return to write the sequel in 1991.

Awards
 Writers Guild of America Award for Television: Episodic Comedy   for an episode of The Wonder Years.

References

External links
 

20th-century American screenwriters
American male screenwriters
American television writers
Living people
Year of birth missing (living people)
University of Michigan College of Engineering alumni
20th-century American male writers